Alban J. Parker (March 21, 1893 – May 10, 1971) was a Vermont attorney and politician who served as Vermont Attorney General from 1941 to 1947.

Biography
Alban James Parker was born in Morrisville, Vermont on March 21, 1893, the son of Joel R. and Ann R. (Bullock) Parker.  He graduated from Morrisville's People's Academy in 1911, and attended Middlebury College. After graduating in 1916, he worked as a school teacher and principal in Keene, New Hampshire, Hartford, Vermont, and White River Junction, Vermont.

Parker enlisted for World War I, was commissioned as a second lieutenant in the Ordnance Corps, and served in the aerial armament field at posts including Camp Devens, Massachusetts, and Selfridge Field, Michigan until receiving his discharge in October 1919.

Upon returning to Vermont, Parker resumed his career as a teacher and principal, and also studied law in the Hartford office of attorney Raymond J. Trainor. In 1926 he was admitted to the bar and began to practice in partnership with Trainor.  He subsequently relocated to Springfield, Vermont, where he continued to practice law.

A Republican, from 1933 to 1937 Parker served as state's attorney for Windsor County.  From 1937 to 1941 he was Vermont's Deputy Attorney General.

In 1940, Parker was the successful Republican nominee for Vermont Attorney General. He was reelected in 1942 and 1944, and served from January 1941 to January 1947.  He did not run for reelection in 1946.

After serving as attorney general, Parker resumed practicing law.  From 1949 to 1953 he served in the Vermont House of Representatives.  In January 1954, he was appointed to fill a vacancy in the Vermont State Senate.

Parker died in Springfield on May 10, 1971.  He was buried at Oakland Cemetery in Springfield.

Family
In 1918, Parker married Alice G. Harriman of Middlebury. In 1941, he married his second wife, Caroline Bernardini.

Parker was the father of three children, daughters Harriet Ann and Judith, and son Richard Henry.

References

Sources

Books

Newspapers

1893 births
1971 deaths
20th-century American politicians
20th-century American lawyers
People from Morristown, Vermont
People from Springfield, Vermont
Middlebury College alumni
Vermont lawyers
State's attorneys in Vermont
Vermont Attorneys General
Republican Party members of the Vermont House of Representatives
Republican Party Vermont state senators
Burials in Vermont